Ryan Ng Zin Rei (born 14 January 1998) is a Singaporean badminton player. In 2011, he elected to join the Singapore national junior team when he was 13 years old. Ng was educated at Raffles Institution, but he moved to Singapore Sports School to prepare himself competed at the 2014 Youth Olympics. In 2015, he attended the Republic Polytechnic Institute. He competed in some international junior tournament and reach the semifinals at the 2014 Badminton Asia U17, quarterfinals at the 2015 Dutch and German Juniors, and at the 2016 BWF World Junior Championships. He also the runner-up at the 2016 India Junior and won the Malaysia Junior at the same year. Ng was the men's team bronze medallists at the 2015 and 2017 Southeast Asian Games. He competed at the 2018 Commonwealth Games.

Achievements

BWF International Challenge/Series 
Men's singles

  BWF International Challenge tournament
  BWF International Series tournament

References

External links 
 

Living people
1998 births
Singaporean male badminton players
Singaporean people of Chinese descent
Singapore Sports School alumni
Badminton players at the 2018 Commonwealth Games
Commonwealth Games competitors for Singapore
Competitors at the 2015 Southeast Asian Games
Competitors at the 2017 Southeast Asian Games
Southeast Asian Games bronze medalists for Singapore
Southeast Asian Games medalists in badminton